Musakhel Bazar, also commonly known as Musakhel, is the capital of Musakhel District in the Balochistan province of Pakistan. It is located at 30°52'0N 69°49'0E with an altitude of 1341 metres (4402 feet).

During the period of British rule the town was the capital of Musakhel Tehsil, then a subdivision of Loralai District.

Rarasham is a  village and Union Council of  District Musakhel, Baluchistan, PK

Tribes like Ghershin and[1] Buzdar are settled in this area of Rarasham. Sardar Meher Shah Gharshin is leading all the tribes in this locality. Landhi and sand band is the most famous dish of Rarasham.

Nearby cities: Musakhel, Loralai, Barkhan, Zhob

Coordinates: 30°21'46"N 69°51'36"E

References

Populated places in Musakhel District